Syrmologa is a genus of moths belonging to the family Tineidae.

Species
Syrmologa chersopa Meyrick, 1919
Syrmologa leucoclistra Meyrick, 1919
Syrmologa spermatias Meyrick, 1919
Syrmologa thriophora Meyrick, 1919

References

Tineidae
Tineidae genera
Taxa named by Edward Meyrick